The Bonaparte Archipelago is a group of islands off the coast of Western Australia in the Kimberley region, within the Shire of Wyndham-East Kimberley. The archipelago was named by the Baudin expedition on 16 August 1801 after Napoleon Bonaparte, First Consul of France.

The islands are mostly small, and many are best described as islets or emergent rocks. They number several hundred in total. Several submerged banks and shoals are also found within the archipelago.

Another significant island is the  Booby Island, which is classified as an Important Bird Area and Jungulu Island found just off-shore from Augustus Island.

Other islands in the group include Uwins Island, Coronation Island and Bigge Island.

See also 
 Browse Island

References 

 
Archipelagoes of Australia
Islands of the Kimberley (Western Australia)